The Carolina Panthers are a professional American football team based in Charlotte, North Carolina. The team was founded in 1993 when they were accepted into the National Football League (NFL) as an expansion team. The Panthers are owned by David Tepper.

The Carolina Panthers began play in 1995, and spent their first 7 seasons in the NFC West division, making it to the NFC Championship game in 1996, which was only their 2nd year as a football franchise.

In 2002, the Panthers were moved to the NFC South after the NFL realigned their divisions due to the Houston Texans joining the league as an expansion team. Over their 27 seasons in the NFL, the Panthers have played in over 300 games, winning 6 division titles (one in the NFC West and five in the NFC South) and reaching the NFL playoffs 8 times. The Panthers have never had back-to-back winning seasons, but recorded their first back-to-back-to-back playoff seasons in 2013 and 2014, becoming the first team in the history of the NFC South to win consecutive division titles in the process. They won a third consecutive division title in 2015, finishing with a league-best 15–1 record and securing homefield advantage in the playoffs for the first time in team history.

The team's worst regular season record was 2001, where they finished 1–15, worst in the league for that season; although they won their first game, they lost each of the remaining 15. The team has reached the Super Bowl twice; in 2003, when they lost Super Bowl XXXVIII 32–29 to the New England Patriots, and 2015, when they lost Super Bowl 50 24–10 to the Denver Broncos. Overall, the team has recorded seven winning seasons, 17 losing seasons, and three 8–8 seasons; they have reached the playoffs eight times. They also finished with a 7–9 record eight times. Including the playoffs, they have an overall record of 209 wins, 223 losses, and 1 tie (.484 winning percentage).

Seasons

All-time records

Footnotes

References

External links
 ESPN.com. Carolina Panthers News, Schedule, Players, Stats, Video – NFL.

Seasons
National Football League teams seasons